Schwegman Lundberg & Woessner, P.A. (Formerly Schwegman, Lundberg, Woessner & Kluth, P.A.) is a Minneapolis, Minnesota based intellectual property law firm founded by three attorneys in December 1993. The firm was one of the first patent law firms in the United States to focus solely on patent prosecution and not on patent litigation (although this practice was already fairly common in Europe).

Locations 
The Schwegman firm has offices located in Minneapolis, Minnesota; Silicon Valley, California; Austin Texas; and the United Kingdom, and has 25 satellite locations throughout the United States.

Awards and recognition 
Top quality ranking from IAM / Ocean Tomo (2015, 2016. 2017).

Ranked in the top twenty in US Utility Patent filings by IPWatchdog (2017)

Winner of the Innovators in Health & Wellness – Excellence in Professional Service award by Minnesota Business magazine (2017)

References

External links
Profile at the National Law Review
Hyperion Research - Overview of FoundationIP software

Patent law firms
Law firms established in 1993
Law firms based in Minneapolis
Trademark law
Intellectual property law